The 1862 Melbourne Cup was a two-mile  handicap horse race which took place on Thursday, 13 November 1862.

This year was the second running of the Melbourne Cup and Archer's back-to-back wins would not be repeated again for over one hundred years, until Rain Lover's wins.

This is the list of placegetters for the 1862 Melbourne Cup.

The remaining runners were as follows (given in approximate finishing order where not known).

See also

 Melbourne Cup
 List of Melbourne Cup winners
 Victoria Racing Club

References

1862
Melbourne Cup
Melbourne Cup
19th century in Melbourne
1860s in Melbourne